Puckane, officially Puckaun, is a village in County Tipperary, Ireland. It is also a parish in the Roman Catholic Diocese of Killaloe. The village is located 10 km north of Nenagh along the R493 and close to Lough Derg and Dromineer. It had a population of 250 people as of the 2016 census.

People
The songwriter Shane MacGowan spent much of his childhood in the neighbouring townland of Carney and has immortalised a number of local places in his songs such as "The Broad Majestic Shannon". The village was also mentioned in a well-known Christy Moore cover of Shane MacGowan and The Pogues song "The Fairy Tale of New York".
A local landmark is "Paddy Kennedy's Pub". Ireland's 2015 Eurovision entrant Molly Sterling hails from Puckane.

Literature
It should not be confused with the eponymous fictional village in Spike Milligan's novel Puckoon.

Sport
Kildangan GAA is the local Gaelic Athletic Association club.

Transport
Bus Éireann route 322 provides a service to and from Nenagh on Fridays. Rail services can be accessed at Nenagh railway station.

See also
 List of towns and villages in Ireland

References

Parishes of the Roman Catholic Diocese of Killaloe
Towns and villages in County Tipperary